Andrea Jurčić (born 21 June 1972) is a retired Croatian badminton and volleyball player.

In badminton, Jurčić is a nine-time Croatian singles champion, seven-time mixed doubles champion, and six-time doubles champion.

Her greatest success in volleyball was winning gold in the 1993 Mediterranean Games with the Croatian national team. Jurčić retired from competitive sport in 2000 and is currently a beach volleyball coach in Zagreb.

Sources

External links
 

1972 births
Living people
Croatian female badminton players
Croatian women's volleyball players
Sportspeople from Zagreb
Croatian volleyball coaches
Competitors at the 1993 Mediterranean Games
Mediterranean Games gold medalists for Croatia
Mediterranean Games medalists in volleyball